Herbert Herries, 1st Lord Herries of Terregles (died c. 1505), was a Scottish peer.

Herries was summoned to the Scottish Parliament as Lord Herries of Terregles in 1490. He died about 1505 and was succeeded in the lordship of Parliament by his son Andrew.

References
Kidd, Charles, Williamson, David (editors). Debrett's Peerage and Baronetage (1990 edition). New York: St Martin's Press, 1990,

Notes

15th-century births
1505 deaths
Lords Herries of Terregles
Peers created by James IV
Lords of Parliament (pre-1707)